Ait Kamara is a village located  south of the city of Al Hoceima, in the Aït Waryaghar's tribe, in the Rif region of Morocco. It was affected by the 2004 Al Hoceima earthquake. National Route 16 connects it to Tetouan in the west. There is a nearby commercial airport that has been used as a military airport for some time.

Large part of its inhabitants emigrated to Europe during the 80's. 40% of them emigrated to France and mainly in the city of La Rochelle, 35% emigrated to the Netherlands, 20% emigrated to Belgium and Spain, and 5% in Norway, Sweden and the United States of America.

A new football stadium is being built along with the progression of the new economic zone.

References

Populated places in Al Hoceïma Province
Rural communes of Tanger-Tetouan-Al Hoceima
Rif